Ferruccio Amendola (22 July 1930 – 3 September 2001) was an Italian actor and voice actor.

Biography
Born in Turin to actors Federico Amendola and Amelia Ricci and the nephew of director and screenwriter Mario Amendola, he was among Italy's most accomplished actors who worked for cinema and television and also did extensive voice dubbing work. Amendola moved to Rome with his family at a young age and he made his film debut at age 13 in Gian Burrasca directed by Sergio Tofano and continued working on cinema, television and theatre in his later years.

In 1945, Amendola made his voice-over debut dubbing over Vito Annicchiarico's role in the film Rome, Open City. By 1968, Amendola began devoting most of his time to voice-over acting and eventually became well known as an Italian voice dubbing pioneer. He was best known as the Italian voice of famous actors including Al Pacino, Sylvester Stallone, Dustin Hoffman, Robert De Niro and Tomas Milian in a majority of their movies. He also dubbed Peter Falk as well as Bill Cosby in the television series The Cosby Show as well as Cosby. In addition, he has done the voice over in commercials and TV dramas with great success.

Personal life
From his relationship with his ex-wife Rita Savagnone who is a voice-over actress, he had two sons, Federico, who was named after his father and Claudio, who is also an actor. He also had a daughter, Silvia from his second marriage. Through Claudio, his granddaughter Alessia Amendola is a voice actress.

Death
Amendola died of throat cancer in Rome on 3 September 2001 at the age of 71. He was interred at the Campo Verano.

Filmography

Cinema
Gian Burrasca (1943)
 Eleven Men and a Ball (1948)
Le signorine dello 04 (1955)
La ragazza di Via Veneto (1955)
7 canzoni per 7 sorelle (1957)
I dritti  (1958)
Napoli, sole mio! (1958)
I prepotenti (1958)
La zia d'america va a sciare (1958)
La cento chilometri (1959)
Prepotenti più di prima (1959)
Fantasmi e ladri (1959)
La grande guerra (1959)
Simpatico mascalzone (1959)
La banda del buco (1960)
Il ladro di Damasco (1963)
Maciste gladiatore di Sparta (1965)
West and Soda (1965) – Voice
Folli d'estate (1966)
 Honeymoon, Italian Style (1966)
Cuore matto... matto da legare (1967)
Marinai in coperta (1967)
Riderà (1967)
La vuole lui... lo vuole lei (1967)
Vacanze sulla Costa Smeralda (1968)
Donne, botte e bersaglieri (1968)
Lacrime d'amore (1970)
La Tosca (1973)
Extra (1976)
Tre tigri contro tre tigri (1977)
Chissà perché... capitano tutte a me (1980)
Storia d'amore e d'amicizia (1982)
Quei trentasei gradini (1984–1985)
Little Roma (1987)
Pronto soccorso (1990)
Pronto soccorso 2 (1992)

Dubbing roles

Animation
Corporal Weaver in Antz
Brom Bones in The Adventures of Ichabod and Mr. Toad
Narrator (2nd voice) in Wacky Races

Live action
Jon Rubin in Greetings 
Jon Rubin in Hi, Mom! 
Alfredo Berlinghieri in 1900
Travis Bickle in Taxi Driver
Jimmy Doyle in New York, New York
Mike Vronsky in The Deer Hunter
Jake LaMotta in Raging Bull
Rupert Pupkin in The King of Comedy 
"Noodles" in Once Upon a Time in America
Frank Raftis in Falling in Love
Al Capone in The Untouchables
Jack Walsh in Midnight Run
Ned in We're No Angels
Jimmy Conway in Goodfellas
Leonard Lowe in Awakenings
Max Cady in Cape Fear
Donald Rimgale in Backdraft
Lorenzo Anello in A Bronx Tale
Dwight Hansen in This Boy's Life
The Creation in Mary Shelley's Frankenstein
Neil McCauley in Heat
Gil "Curly" Renard in The Fan
Father Bobby in Sleepers
Wally Carter in Marvin's Room
Moe Tilden in Cop Land
Louis Gara in Jackie Brown
Walter Koontz in Flawless
Paul Vitti in Analyze This
Leslie Sunday in Men of Honor
David Merrill in Guilty by Suspicion
Joseph "Megs" Megessey in Jacknife
Evan Wright in Mistress
Wayne Dobie in Mad Dog and Glory
Harry Fabian in Night and the City
Stanley Cox in Stanley & Iris
Ted Kramer in Kramer vs. Kramer
Jack Crabb in Little Big Man
Carl Bernstein in All the President's Men
Dutch Schultz in Billy Bathgate
Captain Hook in Hook
Michael Dorsey in Tootsie
Wally Stanton in Agatha
Enrico Salvatore "Ratso" Rizzo in Midnight Cowboy
David Sumner in Straw Dogs
Georgie Soloway in Who Is Harry Kellerman and Why Is He Saying Those Terrible Things About Me?
Alfredo Sbisà in Alfredo, Alfredo
Louis Dega in Papillon
Max Dembo in Straight Time
Dustin Hoffman in Terror in the Aisles
Willy Loman in Death of a Salesman
Chuck Clarke in Ishtar
Raymond Babbitt in Rain Man
Vito McMullen in Family Business
Bernie LaPlante in Hero
Sam Daniels in Outbreak
Teach in American Buffalo
Max Brackett in Mad City
Norman Goodman in Sphere
Michael Corleone in The Godfather
Michael Corleone in The Godfather Part II
Michael Corleone in The Godfather Part III
Tony Montana in Scarface
Tom Dobb in Revolution
Bobby in The Panic in Needle Park
Frank Serpico in Serpico
Bobby Deerfield in Bobby Deerfield
Frank Keller in Sea of Love
"Big Boy" in Dick Tracy
Johnny in Frankie and Johnny
Grandpa in Two Bits
Arthur Kirkland in ...And Justice for All
Rocky Balboa in Rocky II
Rocky Balboa in Rocky III
Rocky Balboa in Rocky IV
Rocky Balboa in Rocky V
Jack Carter in Get Carter 
Jerry Savage in No Place to Hide
Cosmo Carboni in Paradise Alley
Robert Hatch in Escape to Victory
John Rambo in First Blood
John Rambo in Rambo: First Blood Part II
John Rambo in Rambo III
Deke DaSilva in Nighthawks
Nick Martinelli in Rhinestone
Marion "Cobra" Cobretti in Cobra
Lincoln Hawk in Over the Top
Raymond Tango in Tango & Cash
Frank Leone in Lock Up
Angelo "Snaps" Provolone in Oscar
Joe Bomowski in Stop! Or My Mom Will Shoot
John Spartan in Demolition Man
Gabe Walker in Cliffhanger
Ray Quick in The Specialist
Judge Joseph Dredd in Judge Dredd
Robert Rath in Assassins
Kit Latura in Daylight
Sylvester Stallone in An Alan Smithee Film: Burn Hollywood Burn
Nico Giraldi in The Cop in Blue Jeans
Nico Giraldi in Hit Squad
Nico Giraldi in Squadra antitruffa
Nico Giraldi in Little Italy
Nico Giraldi in The Gang That Sold America
Nico Giraldi in Assassination on the Tiber
Nico Giraldi in Crime at Porta Romana
Nico Giraldi / Ciu Ci Ciao in Crime at the Chinese Restaurant
Nico Giraldi in Crime on the Highway
Nico Giraldi in Crime in Formula One
Nico Giraldi in Cop in Drag
Giulio Sacchi in Almost Human
Rienzi in Silent Action
Rambo in Syndicate Sadists
Vincenzo Moretto in The Tough Ones
Detective in The Twist
Sergio Marazzi in Free Hand for a Tough Cop
Sergio Marazzi in Destruction Force
Vincenzo Marazzi / Sergio Marazzi in Brothers Till We Die
Commissioner in Young, Violent, Dangerous
Luigi Maietto in The Cynic, the Rat and the Fist
Baba in Messalina, Messalina!
Cuckoo in The Wolf and the Lamb
Gino Quirino in Manolesta
Quinto Cecioni in Against Each Other, Practically Friends
Lieutenant Colombo in Columbo (pilot episodes)
Tony Pino in The Brink's Job
Vince Ricardo in The In-Laws
Harry Buscafusco in Vibes
Nick Longhetti in A Woman Under the Influence
Pedro Carmichael in Tune in Tomorrow
Rocky Holzcek in Roommates
Cliff Huxtable in The Cosby Show
Guy Hanks in The Cosby Mysteries
Hilton Lucas in Cosby
Auguste Rodin in Camille Claudel
Bernard Coudray in The Woman Next Door
The Graf in The Marquise of O
Jonathan Harker in Nosferatu the Vampyre
Emmett "Doc" Brown in Back to the Future
White Knight in Alice in Wonderland
Corporal Reyes in Zorro
Tequila in Tequila and Bonetti
Charlie Snow in Too Much, Too Soon
Frank McAfee in The Boston Strangler
Pepi in The Return of the Pink Panther
Hercule Lajoy in Trail of the Pink Panther
Cleve in Best Seller
Richard Boyle in Salvador
Robert T. Jefferson in The Dirty Dozen
Leslie Anders in Ice Station Zebra
Mike Conroy in A Private's Affair
Paul Gattling in Holiday for Lovers
Chambers in Airport '77
Harold Kaminski in Tora! Tora! Tora!
Mr. Coggins / Second Spy in Chitty Chitty Bang Bang
Frank Wilkins in The Midnight Story
Walter Kosciuszko Waldowski in MASH
George Wilson in The Great Gatsby
Sam Wood in In the Heat of the Night
Porthos in The Three Musketeers
Otto Hansbach in Chuka
John Steele in The Longest Day
Walter Burns in The Front Page
Aaron McComb in Timecop
Roderick Usher in Two Evil Eyes
Andy Leonard / Will in Never Say Goodbye
Mr. Columbato in Birdy

References

External links

1930 births
2001 deaths
Actors from Turin
Italian male child actors
Italian male film actors
Italian male stage actors
Italian male television actors
Italian male voice actors
Italian voice directors
20th-century Italian male actors
Deaths from cancer in Lazio
Deaths from throat cancer
Burials at Campo Verano